Tsunehisa is a masculine Japanese given name.

Possible writings
Tsunehisa can be written using different combinations of kanji characters. Here are some examples:

常久, "usual, long time"
常尚, "usual, still"
常寿, "usual, long life"
恒久, "always, long time"
恒尚, "always, still"
恒寿, "always, long life"
庸久, "common, long time"
庸尚, "common, still"
庸寿, "common, long life"
毎久, "every, long time"
毎尚, "every, still"
毎寿, "every, long life"

The name can also be written in hiragana つねひさ or katakana ツネヒサ.

Notable people with the name
, Japanese daimyō.
, Japanese artist.
, Japanese prince and general.
, Japanese sprint canoeist.

Japanese masculine given names